The Czech Republic has participated in the biennial classical music competition Eurovision Young Musicians eight times since its debut in 2002, winning the contest for the first time in 2022.

Participation overview

See also
Czech Republic in the Eurovision Song Contest
Czech Republic in the Eurovision Young Dancers

References

External links 
 Eurovision Young Musicians

Countries in the Eurovision Young Musicians